is a female announcer for Fuji TV. She is a former Japanese women's professional shogi player who was ranked 1-dan. In December 2018, she announced her intention to retire from professional shogi and leave the Japan Shogi Association at the end of March 2019 to pursue other opportunities as well as to focus on her studies in political science and economics at Waseda University. She is formerly managed by Watanabe Entertainment as one of their "Intellectual Tarentos", appearing on Japanese variety shows and making personal appearances. In April 2021, she joined Fuji TV as announcer.

Appearances

As Fuji TV announcer 

 Live News it! (2 Jul 2021 – ) - Field caster

As television personality 

 Banjō no Alpha (NHK BS Premium, 24 Feb 2019) - as Hina Kurahashi II

Shogi professional

Promotion history
Takemata's promotion history was as follows:
2012, October 1:  2-kyū
2015, July 1: 1-kyū
2016, April 1: 1-dan

Note: All ranks are women's professional ranks.

References

External links
 Japan Shogi Association official profile page
 ShogiHub: Takemata, Beni

Japanese shogi players
Living people
Women's professional shogi players
Professional shogi players from Tokyo
People from Minato
1998 births
Retired women's professional shogi players
Japanese television personalities
Japanese announcers
Waseda University alumni